Pasi Määttänen is a Finnish professional ice hockey forward who currently plays for Ilves of the SM-liiga.

References

External links

Living people
Ilves players
Year of birth missing (living people)
Finnish ice hockey forwards